CHIN may refer to:

 Canadian Heritage Information Network, a government agency in Canada that promotes Canadian culture and heritage on the Internet
 CHIN Radio/TV International, a media company based in Toronto, Ontario, Canada
 CHIN (AM), a radio station (1540 AM) licensed to Toronto, Ontario, Canada
 CHIN-FM, a radio station (100.7 FM) licensed to Toronto, Ontario, Canada

See also
 Chin (disambiguation)

These meanings are distinct from the word chin.